Sarah Siddons' House, also called the Old House, is a cottage in the village of Lydbrook, Gloucestershire, England. A Grade II* listed building, the cottage was reputedly the childhood home of the actor Sarah Siddons.

History and description
The village of Lydbrook stands in the Wye Valley, on the edge of the Forest of Dean. In the mid-18th century, the village was reputedly the home of Roger Kemble, an actor-manager and patriarch of the Kemble family. His most famous child, Sarah was born at Brecon in 1755, while her father's company, the Warwickshire Company of Comedians was on tour in Wales. In the 19th century, the tradition developed that Sarah was bought up in the cottage at Lydbrook, where Roger Kemble was known to have owned property. Siddons went on to become "the country's finest tragic actress", dying in London in 1831.
  
The cottage dates from the 16th century. Alan Brooks, in the revised 2002 Gloucestershire volume of Pevsner's Buildings of England series, describes it as a "good timber-framed house". There is an extension to the side dated 1718. The timber frame is infilled with brick nogging to the front. The cottage is a Grade II* listed building.

Notes

References

Sources
 
 

Grade II* listed buildings in Gloucestershire
Grade II* listed houses